California's 14th State Assembly district is one of 80 California State Assembly districts. It is currently represented by Democrat Tim Grayson of Concord.

District profile 
The district is located in the East Bay and North Bay, spanning the Carquinez Strait. Parts of the Diablo Range are also in the district, including Mount Diablo itself.

Contra Costa County – 30.6%
 Clayton
 Concord
 Martinez
 Pittsburg – 77.8%
 Pleasant Hill
 Rodeo
 Walnut Creek – 17.5%

Solano County – 35.4%
 Benicia
 Vallejo

Election results from statewide races

List of Assembly Members 
Due to redistricting, the 14th district has been moved around different parts of the state. The current iteration resulted from the 2011 redistricting by the California Citizens Redistricting Commission.

Election results 1992 - present

2020

2018

2016

2014

2012

2010

2008

2006

2004

2002

2000

1998

1996

1994

1992

See also 
 California State Assembly
 California State Assembly districts
 Districts in California

References

External links 
 District map from the California Citizens Redistricting Commission

14th
Government in the San Francisco Bay Area
Government of Contra Costa County, California
Government of Solano County, California